Senator Fort may refer to:

George Franklin Fort (1809–1872), New Jersey State Senate
Greenbury L. Fort (1825–1883), Illinois State Senate
Robert Boal Fort (1867–1904), Illinois State Senate
Vincent Fort (born 1956), Georgia State Senate